Kathy is a feminine first name. It may derive from names including Katherine, Kathleen, and Kathryn, or it may stand on its own as a given name.

Popularity

In the United States, the popularity of the name Kathy peaked in 1958, when it was the No. 14 name of baby girls. Since then, it has consistently fallen. Most recently it was ranked 888 in 2005, nearing the 927th place it held in 1932.

Image or stereotype

According to The Baby Name Personality Survey by Bruce Lansky and Barry Sinrod (1990), people imagine a Kathy to be "a small dark-haired woman who is quiet, friendly, and very kind." The name Kathy spelled with a "C" conjures a different image, according to the survey.

See also
 Kathy (disambiguation)

References 

Given names